Gurdaspur district (Doabi:ਗੁਰਦਸਪੂਰ ਜ਼ਿਲਾ) is a district in the state of Punjab, situated in the northwest part of the Republic of India. Gurdaspur is the district headquarters. It internationally borders Narowal district of the Pakistani Punjab, Kathua district of Jammu and Kashmir, the Punjab districts of Amritsar and Hoshiarpur, and Chamba and Kangra districts of Himachal Pradesh. Two main rivers, the Beas and the Ravi, pass through the district. The Mughal emperor Akbar is said to have been enthroned in a garden near Kalanaur, a historically important town in the district. The district is in the foothills of the Himalayas.

Cities and Towns 

Achal
Batala
Bhaini mian khan
Bharath
Bharoli Kalan
Borewala Afghana
Buche Nangal
Budha The
Chhina
 Dadwan
Dera Baba Nanak
Dhariwal
Dina Nagar
Dorangla
Dula Nangal
Fatehgarh Churian
Ghuman
Ghuman Khurd
Gosal Afghana
Gosal Zimidaran
Gurdaspur
Janial
Jogowal Jattan
Kahnuwan
Kala Afghana
Kalanaur
Kaler Kalan
Kathiali
Khaira
Ladha Munda
Mann Sandwal
Mastkot
Mian Kot
Naserke
Parowal
Qadian
Rangar Nangal
Ranjit Bagh
Rattangarh
Sri Hargobindpur
Talwandi Virk
Tibber
Umarpura

References 

Gurdaspur
Gurdaspur